The Red Lake Miners are a Canadian junior 'A' ice hockey team based in Red Lake, Ontario. The Miners play in Hockey Canada's Superior International Junior Hockey League.

History
In May 2013, the SIJHL announced that the Ear Falls Eagles would be joining the league for the 2013–14 season. Weeks later, it was announced that the team would instead be called the English River Miners to better represent the entire community.

On September 20, 2013, the Miners played the first game in their franchise's history in Dryden, Ontario, against the Dryden Ice Dogs. The Miners lost 4–2 after giving up two last minute goals, one of which was on an empty net. Nathan Johnson scored the first goal in team history 6:06 into the first period. Greg Harney played the first game in net, making 32 saves. On October 10, 2013, the Miners picked up their first franchise victory, on home ice, defeating the Wisconsin Wilderness by a score of 3–1. Devan Vander Wyk scored the eventual game-winning goal 3:47 into the third period, while Holden Melgoza made 29 saves for the victory.

After finishing last in the SIJHL in their second season, Derek Sweet-Coulter was named head coach for Miners in 2015. One season later, the English River Miners moved to Red Lake, Ontario, with the Cochenour Arena as their home ice. In August 2018, the team rebranded as the Red Lake Miners. Sweet-Coulter led the Miners for four seasons before leaving to coach for the Merritt Centennials of the British Columbia Hockey League after winning the SIJHL Coach of the Year in 2019.

Former professional hockey player Geoff Walker was then hired as general manager and head coach for the 2019–20 season. Walker came to Red Lake after one season leading the Hinton Wildcats in the Western States Hockey League to a 23–19–1–2 record in that team's only season.

Season-by-season records

References

External links
Red Lake Miners
Superior International Junior Hockey League

Superior International Junior Hockey League teams
Sport in Northern Ontario
Ice hockey clubs established in 2013
2013 establishments in Ontario
Red Lake, Ontario